The Miller–Rowe–Holgate House at 18 Winter St. in Reno, Nevada is a historic house that was built in 1902–03.  It was listed on the National Register of Historic Places in 2005; the listing included two contributing buildings.

It was deemed significant "for its association with the community planning and development area of
significance, and the evolution of building use in Powning's Addition" development of Reno.  After remodeling, the structure provided three apartments (flats) as housing to serve Reno's profitable divorce trade.

References 

Houses completed in 1903
Houses on the National Register of Historic Places in Nevada
Colonial Revival architecture in Nevada
National Register of Historic Places in Reno, Nevada
Houses in Reno, Nevada